Zhou Xiaoping (born 24 April 1981) is a Chinese essayist and popular blogger. His most well-known works are Please Do Not Fail This Era!, Young, do you really know about this country?, Where did our heroes go?, and Nine Tricks of the United States Cultural Cold War. He is a supporter of communist party rule and has expressed nationalist, anti-American and anti-Western sentiment. Zhou is noted for praising by Communist Party General Secretary Xi Jinping at a conference on art and literature. Xi lauded Zhou for spreading "positive energy" in 2014.

Life
Zhou was born and raised in Zigong, Sichuan, after junior high school, he started to publish works in 1996. "Cutlassfish Zhou" became the nickname for his nationalist, pro-Communist, pro-Chinese government and anti-American writing. Zhou has been praised by General Secretary Xi Jinping for his "positive energy".

Works
 Please Do Not Fail This Era!
 Young, do you really know about this country?
 Where did our heroes go?
 Nine Tricks of the United States Cultural Cold War

References

External links

1981 births
Writers from Zigong
Living people
Archibald Prize Salon des Refusés People's Choice Award winners
People's Republic of China writers
Chinese bloggers
Members of the 14th Chinese People's Political Consultative Conference